Angus Reid (born September 23, 1976, in Richmond, British Columbia) is a former offensive lineman who played in the Canadian Football League. Reid went to Simon Fraser University and played for the Simon Fraser Clan. He began his career with the Montreal Alouettes but was traded, along with a 5th round draft pick, to BC for Adriano Belli. In 2004, Reid was selected to the West Division All-Star Team for the first time in his career. He was also named CFL lineman of the week for week #7. In 2005, Reid started all 18 games including the West Division Final against the Edmonton Eskimos.

Reid missed three years of college football at Simon Fraser because of gastrointestinal problems linked to Crohn's disease but he played every CFL game from the 2002 to 2008 CFL seasons including the 92nd and 94th Grey Cups.

In 1999 he played for the German team Hamburg Blue Devils.

He announced his retirement from football on March 7, 2014.

Further reading 
 Guest blog: Angus Reid, Win the Day

References

External links 
 BC Lions bio

1976 births
Living people
BC Lions players
People from Richmond, British Columbia
Players of Canadian football from British Columbia
Simon Fraser Clan football players